Yukon Gold is a 1952 American Northern film directed by Frank McDonald and starring Kirby Grant, Martha Hyer and Harry Lauter. The film was seventh in the series of ten films featuring Kirby Grant as a Canadian Mountie.

Cast
 Kirby Grant as RCMP Corporal Rod Webb
 Martha Hyer as Marie Briand 
 Harry Lauter as Ace Morgan 
 Philip Van Zandt as Clint McClay 
 Frances Charles as Nan Duval, Saloon Owner 
 Mauritz Hugo as Jud Powers  
 James Parnell as Renault  
 Sam Flint as Boat Captain  
 Roy Gordon as Inspector  
 Hal Gerard as Sam  
 I. Stanford Jolley as Charlie  
 Ward Blackburn as Henchman  
 Chinook as Chinook, Webb's Dog

See also
 Trail of the Yukon (1949)
 The Wolf Hunters (1949)
 Snow Dog (1950)
 Call of the Klondike (1950)
 Northwest Territory (1951)
 Yukon Manhunt (1951)
 Fangs of the Arctic (1953)
 Northern Patrol (1953)
 Yukon Vengeance (1954)

References

Bibliography
 Drew, Bernard. Motion Picture Series and Sequels: A Reference Guide. Routledge, 2013.

External links
 

1952 films
1952 Western (genre) films
American Western (genre) films
American black-and-white films
Corporal Rod Webb (film series)
1950s English-language films
Films based on American novels
Films based on works by James Oliver Curwood
Films directed by Frank McDonald
Films set in Yukon
Monogram Pictures films
Northern (genre) films
Royal Canadian Mounted Police in fiction
1950s American films